is a former rugby union footballer who played for Japan. He played as a prop.

Career
He was part of the Japanese national team during the 1991 Rugby World Cup, the 1993 Japan rugby union tour of Argentina and the 1993 Japan rugby union tour of Wales, but his debut as full international, which was also his last match, was against Canada in Tokyo, on 9 June 1996.

Notes

External links

1968 births
Living people
Sportspeople from Osaka
Japanese rugby union players
Rugby union props
Japan international rugby union players
Toyota Verblitz players